Emerson, Lake & Powell is the only studio album by English progressive rock band Emerson, Lake & Powell, released on 26 May 1986 by Polydor Records.

The album's debut single was "Touch and Go" which peaked at number 60 on the Billboard charts on 19 July 1986.  Cash Box called it a "thunderous, large scale rock drama."

The main synthesizer part of "Touch and Go" is based on the English folk tune "Lovely Joan". Another version of "Touch and Go" was recorded by Emerson, Lake & Palmer and is included in the box set The Return of the Manticore (1993).

Track listing

Personnel

Emerson, Lake & Powell
 Keith Emerson – keyboards
 Greg Lake – vocals, guitars, bass, production
 Cozy Powell – drums, percussion

Technical personnel
 Tony Taverner – production, engineer, mixing engineer
 Greg Calbi – mastering engineer (at Sterling Sound, New York)
 Debra Bishop – design

Charts

Certifications

References

Emerson, Lake & Powell albums
1986 debut albums
Progressive rock albums by English artists
Polydor Records albums
Albums produced by Greg Lake